The Special Collectors Edition is a collection of B-sides by Blur, released in Japan in 1994. The B-sides are from singles from the albums Leisure, Modern Life Is Rubbish and Parklife. The last track is not a B-side but actually a recording of fans singing "Bank Holiday" at Narita Airport, Tokyo.

Track listing
"Day Upon Day" (Live at Moles Club, Bath, 19 December 1990) – 4:03
"Inertia" – 3:48
"Luminous" – 3:12
"Mace" – 3:25
"Badgeman Brown" – 4:47
"Hanging Over" – 4:27
"Peach" – 3:57
"When the Cows Come Home" – 3:49
"Maggie May" – 4:05
"Es Schmecht" – 3:35
"Fried" (featuring Seymour) – 2:34
"Anniversary Waltz" – 1:24
"Threadneedle Street" – 3:18
"Got Yer!" – 1:48
"Supa Shoppa" – 3:02
"Beard" – 1:45
"Theme from an Imaginary Film" – 3:34
"Bank Holiday" – 1:10

Production credits
Blur: "Inertia", "Luminous", "Mace", "Badgeman Brown", "Es Schmecht", "Threadneedle Street", and "Got Yer!"
Blur and John Smith: "Hanging Over", "Peach", "Supa Shoppa" and "Beard"
Steve Lovell: "Maggie May"
Stephen Street: "When the Cows Come Home", "Anniversary Waltz" and "Theme from an Imaginary Film"

References 

Blur (band) albums
B-side compilation albums
Albums produced by Stephen Street
1994 compilation albums